William Starling Poole (born July 24, 1981) is a former American football defensive back. He was drafted by the Miami Dolphins in the fourth round of the 2004 NFL Draft. He played college football at Southern California.

Poole was also a member of the Kansas City Chiefs, Toronto Argonauts, Hamilton Tiger-Cats, Sacramento Mountain Lions and San Antonio Talons.

Early years
Poole was a top high school player at Christ The King Regional High School in New York City and a Parade All-American his junior year. He also competed on their nationally ranked basketball team.

College career
He is a University of Southern California graduate whose senior team split the collegiate national championship with Louisiana State University.  He first went to Boston College.  Following that he went to Ventura College.  Best known for his standout performance against Michigan which included two sacks in the 2004 Rose Bowl (played on January 1) en route to a USC 28-14 victory.

Awards and honors
 Junior College Athletic Bureau All-American (2002)
 SuperPrep JUCO 100 (2002)
 Western State Conference Mountain Division Defensive MVP (2002)
 Ventura College Team MVP (2002)
 Pac-10 Defensive Player of the Week (November 5, 2003)
 First-team All-Pac-10 selection by CollegeFootballNews.com, ESPN.com and Rivals.com (2003)
 Second-team All-American by the AP and CollegeFootballNews.com
 Honorable mention Rivals.com All-American (2003)
 USC Co-Special Teams Player of the Year (2003)

Professional career

Miami Dolphins
He was drafted in the fourth round by the Miami Dolphins in 2004.  Plagued with knee injuries throughout his career, he played during a promising rookie season and was placed on IR during the 2005 and 2006 seasons then was waived by Miami on December 19, 2006. He tried out for the New Orleans Saints on the weekend of May 12–13, 2007.

First stint with Chiefs
Poole signed a two-year deal with the Kansas City Chiefs on July 27, 2007. However, he was released by the team on September 1 during final cuts.

First stint with Argonauts
On October 4, 2007, Poole was signed by the Toronto Argonauts of the Canadian Football League and assigned to their practice roster.  He was later released by the team on October 10, 2007.

Second stint with Chiefs
On May 27, 2008, Poole was re-signed by the Chiefs. He was released on August 10.

Second stint with Argonauts
Less than a year after being signed to the Toronto Argonauts' practice squad, Poole re-joined the Argonauts on September 8, 2008.

Sacramento Mountain Lions
On May 25, 2011, Poole signed with the Sacramento Mountain Lions of the United Football League.

Personal life 
Poole has a daughter, Kayla Poole.

References

External links
USC Trojans bio

1981 births
Living people
Sportspeople from Queens, New York
Players of American football from New York City
American football cornerbacks
American players of Canadian football
Canadian football defensive backs
Boston College Eagles football players
USC Trojans football players
Miami Dolphins players
Kansas City Chiefs players
Toronto Argonauts players
San Antonio Talons players
Sportspeople from West Virginia
Sportspeople from Beckley, West Virginia